Little Duck Key is a small island in the lower Florida Keys.

U.S. 1 (or the Overseas Highway) crosses the key at approximately mile marker 40, just west of the Seven Mile Bridge.  The west end of the bridge terminates on this island.

The island which is marked on current navigation charts as Little Duck Key is part of a very confusing name history of all the islands located on and near the highway between Pigeon Key and Bahia Honda Key. The key was always known locally as Pacet Key and was given the name Little Duck Key during the construction of the Overseas Railroad.  It has also been known as Big Money Key.  At one point, the island now known as Ohio Key was called Little Duck Key.

The island has a small beach picnic area and boat ramps.

References

Uninhabited islands of Monroe County, Florida
Beaches of Monroe County, Florida
Beaches of Florida
Islands of the Florida Keys
Islands of Florida